Cody Porter (born 23 September 1997) is a Canadian ice hockey goalie from North Vancouver who currently represents Porin Ässät of the Finnish Elite League. Porter has previously represented SaiPa and Tappara in the Finnish Elite League, Zaglebie Sosnowiec in the Polish League, IPK Iisalmi and RoKi in the Mestis.

Career 

For the 2022–2023 season, Porter moved to the Rovaniemen Kiekko's Mestis team with a one-year contract.

In February 2023, RoKi loaned Porter to Tappara with a contract extending to February 12. Tappara signed Porter to patch up injuries on the goaltender front. On February 13, Ässät announced that Porter would join the team with a contract covering the rest of the season. Porter was brought to the team to replace Niklas Rubin's injury.

References 

Ässät players
1997 births
Living people
Canadian ice hockey goaltenders